Branden Lee Hinkle is a retired American professional mixed martial artist. A professional competitor from 1998 until 2016, he competed for the UFC, RINGS, Vale Tudo Japan, Pancrase, the WEF, and the International Vale Tudo Championship.

Background
Born and raised in Jefferson, Ohio, Hinkle holds an accomplished wrestling background, competing at West Liberty State College in West Virginia where he was a two-time NCAA Division II Champion, a U.S. National Freestyle Wrestling All-American and also excelled at tennis, being a West Virginia College Conference Tennis Champion.

Mixed martial arts career

Early career
Hinkle was offered a fight in Brazil for $1,000 and an all-expenses paid trip. He accepted and made his professional debut against future PRIDE veteran Ebenezer Fontes Braga in 1998 for the International Vale Tudo organization in Brazil. The inexperienced Hinkle lost the fight by submission (triangle choke). After amassing a 12-6-1 record, with wins over Travis Fulton, Yoshihisa Yamamoto, and Jorge Rivera, Hinkle was signed by the UFC.

Ultimate Fighting Championship
Hinkle made his UFC debut against Sean Gannon at UFC 55. Gannon, a former Boston police officer, had gained fame for defeating Kimbo Slice in an organized but unsanctioned fight that had was uploaded onto YouTube. Hinkle won the fight by TKO, but dropped his next three consecutive fights against veteran Jeff Monson, former WEC Light Heavyweight Champion Jason Lambert, and another UFC veteran, Alexandre Ferreira.

Post-UFC
Hinkle then bounced back with a unanimous decision win over former PRIDE veteran Roman Zentsov before facing fellow collegiate wrestler and future UFC veteran, Chris Tuchscherer. Hinkle was knocked out by punches. In his next fight he faced UFC and Strikeforce veteran Kevin Jordan, and won by TKO. 

Hinkle then debuted in Pancrase, but lost by submission (rear-naked choke). Hinkle's last professional fight was in 2016, in Woodward, Oklahoma, which he won by submission.

Championships and accomplishments
 NCAA Div II Champion
 US National Freestyle Wrestling All-American
 Korean Neo Fight World Heavyweight Champion
 World Extreme Fighting Heavyweight Champion
 WV College Conference Tennis Champion

Mixed martial arts record

|-
| Win
| align=center| 17–11 (1)
| Marvin Babe
| Submission 
| Horsepower Promotions: Fists of Fury 10
| 
| align=center|  1
| align=center|  2:43
| Woodward, Oklahoma United States
| 
|-
| Win
| align=center| 16–11 (1)
| Alonzo Roane
| TKO (punches)
| Reality Cage Combat: West Virginia vs. the World
| 
| align=center|  2
| align=center|  1:39
| Charleston, West Virginia United States
| 
|-
| Loss
| align=center| 15–11 (1)
| Jessie Gibbs
| Submission (rear-naked choke)
| PFC 3: Pancrase Fighting Championship 3
| 
| align=center|  1
| align=center|  2:25
| Marseille, France
| 
|-
| Win
| align=center| 15–10 (1)
| Kevin Jordan
| TKO (punches)
| DFL 1: The Big Bang
| 
| align=center|  1
| align=center|  2:30
| Atlantic City, New Jersey, United States
| 
|-
| Loss
| align=center| 14–10 (1)
| Chris Tuchscherer
| KO (punches)
| SNMMA: Beatdown at 4 Bears
| 
| align=center|  4
| align=center|  4:43
| New Town, North Dakota, United States
| 
|-
| Win
| align=center| 14–9 (1)
| Roman Zentsov
| Decision (unanimous)
| BodogFIGHT: Alvarez vs Lee
| 
| align=center| 3
| align=center| 5:00
| Trenton, New Jersey, United States
| 
|-
| Loss
| align=center| 13–9 (1)
| Alexandre Ferreira
| Submission (heel hook)
| GFC: Evolution
| 
| align=center| 1
| align=center| 0:37
| Columbus, Ohio, United States
|Return to Heavyweight.
|-
| Loss
| align=center| 13–8 (1)
| Jason Lambert
| TKO (referee stoppage)
| UFC Fight Night 5
| 
| align=center| 1
| align=center| 5:00
| Las Vegas, Nevada, United States
|Light Heavyweight debut.
|-
| Loss
| align=center| 13–7 (1)
| Jeff Monson
| Technical Submission (north-south choke)
| UFC 57: Liddell vs. Couture 3
| 
| align=center| 1
| align=center| 4:35
| Las Vegas, Nevada, United States
| 
|-
| Win
| align=center| 13–6 (1)
| Sean Gannon
| TKO (punches)
| UFC 55
| 
| align=center| 1
| align=center| 4:14
| Uncasville, Connecticut, United States
| 
|-
| Win
| align=center| 12–6 (1)
| Jason DeAngelo
| TKO (submission to punches)
| HHCF 21: Redemption
| 
| align=center| 1
| align=center| N/A
| Columbus, Ohio, United States
| 
|-
| Win
| align=center| 11–6 (1)
| Tommy Sauer
| TKO (punches)
| WEF: Sin City
| 
| align=center| 1
| align=center| 2:19
| Las Vegas, Nevada, United States
| 
|-
| Win
| align=center| 10–6 (1)
| Daisuke Watanabe
| Decision
| NF 5: Neo Fight 5
| 
| align=center| 3
| align=center| 5:00
| South Korea
| 
|-
| Win
| align=center| 9–6 (1)
| Sim Kyum Kim
| TKO (punches)
| NF 5: Neo Fight 5
| 
| align=center| 1
| align=center| 3:26
| South Korea
| 
|-
| Win
| align=center| 8–6 (1)
| Sang Hyun Park
| TKO (leg kick)
| NF 2: Neo Fight 2
| 
| align=center| 1
| align=center| 1:00
| Seoul, South Korea
| 
|-
| NC
| align=center| 7–6 (1)
| Sang Min Lee
| No Contest
| NF 2: Neo Fight 2
| 
| align=center|N/A
| align=center|N/A
| Seoul, South Korea
| 
|-
| Win
| align=center| 7–6
| Rogelio Sanchez
| Submission (armbar)
| VTX: Vale Todo Xtremeo 1
| 
| align=center| 1
| align=center| 1:23
| Nuevo Laredo, Mexico
| 
|-
| Win
| align=center| 6–6
| Eric Knox
| TKO (submission to punches)
| NLF: Next Level Fighting
| 
| align=center| 1
| align=center| 1:00
| Steubenville, Ohio, United States
| 
|-
| Loss
| align=center| 5–6
| Gabriel Gonzaga
| Submission (triangle choke)
| Meca 9: Meca World Vale Tudo 9
| 
| align=center| 1
| align=center| 3:54
| Rio de Janeiro, Brazil
| 
|-
| Win
| align=center| 5–5
| Jorge Rivera
| TKO (corner stoppage)
| RSF 2: Attack at the Track
| 
| align=center| 2
| align=center| 1:54
| Chester, West Virginia, United States
| 
|-
| Win
| align=center| 4–5
| George Allen
| TKO (punches)
| RSF 1: Redemption in the Valley
| 
| align=center| 2
| align=center| N/A
| Wheeling, West Virginia, United States
| 
|-
| Loss
| align=center| 3–5
| Volk Han
| Submission (triangle armbar)
| RINGS: Millennium Combine 2
| 
| align=center| 1
| align=center| 8:11
| Tokyo, Japan
| 
|-
| Win
| align=center| 3–4
| Yoshihisa Yamamoto
| Submission (rear-naked choke)
| WEF 9: World Class
| 
| align=center| 1
| align=center| 2:21
| Evansville, Indiana, United States
| 
|-
| Loss
| align=center| 2–4
| Wataru Sakata
| Submission (leg lock)
| RINGS: Millennium Combine 1
| 
| align=center| 1
| align=center| 7:23
| Tokyo, Japan
| 
|-
| Loss
| align=center| 2–3
| Maurice Smith
| Decision (majority)
| RINGS: King of Kings 1999 Block B
| 
| align=center| 2
| align=center| 5:00
| Osaka, Japan
| 
|-
| Win
| align=center| 2–2
| Travis Fulton
| TKO (punches)
| HFP: Holiday Fight Party
| 
| align=center| 1
| align=center| 12:38
| Georgia, United States
| 
|-
| Loss
| align=center| 1–2
| Carlos Barreto
| Submission (guillotine choke)
| IVC 8: The Road Back to the Top
| 
| align=center| 1
| align=center| 4:32
| Aracaju, Brazil
| 
|-
| Win
| align=center| 1–1
| Masanori Suda
| TKO (upkicks)
| VTJ 1998: Vale Tudo Japan 1998
| 
| align=center| 1
| align=center| 5:26
| Urayasu, Japan
| 
|-
| Loss
| align=center| 0–1
| Ebenezer Fontes Braga
| Submission (triangle choke)
| IVC 6: The Challenge
| 
| align=center| 1
| align=center| 12:33
| Sao Paulo, Brazil
|

References

External links
 
 

Living people
American male mixed martial artists
Mixed martial artists from Ohio
Heavyweight mixed martial artists
Mixed martial artists utilizing collegiate wrestling
Mixed martial artists utilizing freestyle wrestling
1973 births
People from Jefferson, Ohio
Ultimate Fighting Championship male fighters
American male sport wrestlers